Esmond Unwin Butler, OC, CVO (July 13, 1922 – December 18, 1989) was a Canadian diplomat. He was Ambassador Extraordinary and Plenipotentiary to Morocco.  Previously, from 1959 to 1985, he was  Secretary to the Governor General of Canada.

Born in Wawanesa, Manitoba, he was made an Officer of the Order of Canada in recognition for being "one of the key developers of the Canadian Honours System" in 1986.

References

External links 
 Foreign Affairs and International Trade Canada Heads of Post List

1922 births
1989 deaths
Officers of the Order of Canada
Ambassadors of Canada to Morocco
Canadian Commanders of the Royal Victorian Order